Qalupalik (Inuit mythology) – Aquatic human abductor
 Qilin (Chinese) – Dragon-ox-deer hybrid
 Qiqirn (Inuit) – Large, bald dog spirit
 Qliphoth (Jewish) – Evil spirits
 Questing Beast (Arthurian legend) – Serpent-leopard-lion-hart hybrid
Quetzalcoatl (Aztec) – Important Aztec god whose name means "feathered serpent"; he is not to be confused with the quetzal, a type of bird 
 Quinotaur (Frankish) – Five-horned bull

Q